Kaifusi (Kaifu Temple) station is a railway and subway station in Kaifu District, Changsha, Hunan, China, operated by CR Guangzhou and  Changsha Metro. It opened its services on June 28, 2016. Kaifusi/ Temple Station offers interchange between Changsha-Zhuzhou-Xiangtan intercity railway and Changsha Metro Line 1. The metro station opened on 28 June 2016 while the railway station opened on 26 December 2017.

China Railway

Kaifusi station is a railway station in Kaifu District, Changsha, Hunan, China, operated by CR Guangzhou. It opened its services on 26 December 2017. Kaifusi station offers interchange to the Changsha Metro Line 1.

Changsha Metro

Kaifu Temple station is a subway station in Kaifu District, Changsha, Hunan, China, operated by the Changsha subway operator Changsha Metro. It opened its services on 28 June 2016. Kaifu Temple Station offers interchange to the Changsha-Zhuzhou-Xiangtan Intercity Railway.

Layout

Surrounding area
Entrance No. 1: Kaifu Temple
Entrance No. 2: Zhushanyuan Village

References

Railway stations in Hunan
Railway stations in China opened in 2016